The Musée de la Sculpture en Plein Air is a collection of outdoor sculpture located on the banks of the Seine in the 5th arrondissement, Paris, France. The museum opens free of charge.

The museum was created in 1980 in the Jardin Tino Rossi to display sculptures from the second half of the twentieth century. The museum currently contains over fifty sculptures, including pieces by Alexander Archipenko, Jean Arp, César Baldaccini, and Constantin Brâncuși, as well as the following pieces:

 Augustin Cardenas (1927-), La Grande Fenêtre, 1974
 Marta Colvin (1915-), Le Grand Signe, 1970
 Guy de Rougemont (1935-), Interpénétration des deux espaces, 1975
 Reinout d'Haese (Reinhoud) (1928-), Melmoth, 1966
 Marino di Teana (1920-2012), Structure architecturale, 1973
 Étienne-Martin (Étienne Martin) (1913–1995), Demeurre 1, 1954–1958
 Sorel Etrog (1933-), Fiesole, 1965–1967
 Albert Feraud (1921-), Sans titre, 1979
 Yoshikuni Iida (1923-), Shining Wings, 1981
 Jean-Robert Ipoustéguy (1920-), Hydrophage, 1975
 Micha Laury (1946-), Mind Accumulation, 1988
Aglaé Libéraki (1923-1985), Abellio, 1971–1973
 Liuba (1923-), Animal 82, 1982
 Liuba (1923-), Stèle, 1977
 Bernard Pagès (1940-), Sans titre, 1988
 Marta Pan (1923-), Sculpture, 1969
  (1927-), Sculpture, 1979
 Antoine Poncet (1928-), Ochicagogo, 1979
 Nicolas Schöffer (1912–1992), Chronos 10, 1978
 François Stahly (1911-), Neptune II, 1969

See also 
 List of museums in Paris
 Sculpture Park Engelbrecht

References 

 Insecula description and photographs
 Paris Walking Tours description and photographs
 Paris.org entry
 M.-R. Bentein-Stoelen, Catalogue de la collection, Musée de sculpture en plein air, Anvers, 1971. 175 pp.

Sculpture en Plein Air
Sculpture gardens, trails and parks in France
Sculpture en Plein Air
1980 establishments in France
Buildings and structures in the 5th arrondissement of Paris